The 1967 Kansas City Chiefs season was the eighth season for the Kansas City Chiefs as a professional AFL franchise, and fifth in Kansas City. Despite their AFL championship win and an appearance in the inaugural AFL-NFL championship game (Super Bowl I) the previous year, the Chiefs did not advance to the postseason (AFL championship game).

The club’s special teams got a boost with the addition of kicker Jan Stenerud from Montana State and kick returner Noland “Super Gnat” Smith from Tennessee State. The seating capacity at Municipal Stadium was increased from 40,000 to 47,000 due to demand. In June, Jackson County voters approved a $43 million bond issue for construction of a sports complex to be completed by 1972.

The Chiefs' first non-playoff game against an NFL team resulted in a commanding 66–24 preseason victory over the Chicago Bears at Municipal Stadium on August 23. Injuries again hit the club hard during the regular season as the Chiefs clawed their way to a 9–5 record, four games behind the division-winning Oakland Raiders (13–1).

Roster

Preseason

Regular season

Schedule

Game summaries

Week 14

Standings

References

1967 Kansas City Chiefs season
Kansas City Chiefs
Kansas